Broadway Fever is a 1929 American silent comedy film directed by Edward F. Cline and starring Sally O'Neil, Roland Drew and Corliss Palmer. It is now considered a lost film.

Cast
 Sally O'Neil as Sally McAllister 
 Roland Drew as Eric Byron 
 Corliss Palmer as Lila Leroy  
 Calvert Carter as Butler

References

Bibliography
 Pitts, Michael R. Poverty Row Studios, 1929–1940: An Illustrated History of 55 Independent Film Companies, with a Filmography for Each. McFarland & Company, 2005.

External links

1929 films
1929 comedy films
Silent American comedy films
Films directed by Edward F. Cline
American silent feature films
1920s English-language films
Tiffany Pictures films
American black-and-white films
Lost American films
1920s American films